The 18th Annual Gotham Independent Film Awards, presented by the Independent Filmmaker Project, were held on December 2, 2008. The nominees were announced on October 20, 2008. The ceremony was hosted by Aasif Mandvi.

Winners and nominees

Gotham Tributes
 Penélope Cruz
 Sheila Nevins
 Melvin Van Peebles
 Gus Van Sant

References

External links
 

2008 film awards
2008